Roman Aleksandrovich Yanushkovsky (born 4 January 1995) is a Russian football player. He plays for FC Neftekhimik Nizhnekamsk.

Club career
He made his debut in the Russian Professional Football League for FC KAMAZ Naberezhnye Chelny on 18 April 2017 in a game against FC Zenit-Izhevsk.

He made his Russian Football National League debut for FC Rotor Volgograd on 22 July 2018 in a game against FC Luch Vladivostok.

Best player and top scorer (4 goals) of 2019 FNL Cup.

References

External links
 
 
 
 Profile by Russian Professional Football League

1995 births
Footballers from Moscow
Living people
Russian footballers
Association football wingers
FC Sportakademklub Moscow players
FC KAMAZ Naberezhnye Chelny players
FC Rotor Volgograd players
FC Neftekhimik Nizhnekamsk players
Russian First League players
Russian Second League players